The Mississippi Museum of Art is a public museum in Jackson, Mississippi. It is the largest museum in Mississippi.

Location
It is located at the corner of 380 South Lamar Street and 201 East Pascagoula Street in Jackson, Mississippi.

History
The Mississippi Art Association was founded in 1911. By 1978, the Mississippi Museum of Art was founded, and it was located in the Arts Center of Mississippi until 2007.

Permanent collection
The museum is the largest museum in Mississippi. Its permanent collection includes paintings by American, Mississippi and British painters as well as photographs, collage artworks and sculptures.

American painters
Albert Bierstadt (1830–1902)
Mary Cassatt (1844–1926)
Arthur Bowen Davies (1863–1928)
Robert Henri (1865–1921)
George Inness (1825–1894)
Jacob Lawrence (1917–2000)
Georgia O'Keeffe (1887–1986)
Reginald Marsh (1898–1954)
Thomas Sully (1783–1872)
James Abbott McNeill Whistler (1834–1903)

Photography, collage and sculpture
Romare Bearden (1911–1988)
Alexander Calder (1898–1976)
Elizabeth Catlett (1915–2012)
John DeAndrea (born 1941)
William Eggleston (born 1939)
Walker Evans (1903–1975)
Howard Finster (1916–2001)
Malvina Hoffman (1885–1966)
Paul Manship (1985–1966)
John Marin (1870–1953)
Reuben Nakian (1897–1986)
Cindy Sherman (born 1954)
Jimmy Lee Sudduth (1910–2007)
Sarah Mary Taylor (1916–2000)
Mose Tolliver (1920–2006)
Andy Warhol (1928–1987)

Mississippi and Southern artists
Gaines Ruger Donoho (1857–1916)
Eudora Welty (1909–2001)
Theora Hamblett
Ethel Wright Mohamed
Sulton Rogers
William Dunlap
Sam Gilliam
Birney Imes
Valerie Jaudon
Gwendolyn A. Magee
Ken Marlow
Ed McGowin
Lallah Miles Perry (1926-2008)
Tom Rankin
Walter Inglis Anderson (1903–1965)
Caroline Russell Compton
Marie Hull
Mary Katherine Loyacano McCravey
George E. Ohr (1857–1918)
Edgar Parker
William R. Hollingsworth, Jr. (1910-1944)

References

Art museums and galleries in Mississippi
Art museums established in 1978
Museums in Jackson, Mississippi
1978 establishments in Mississippi